is a Japanese voice actor affiliated with 81 Produce.

Voice roles

Anime television series
Desert Punk (小出水満)
Major 2nd series (Yabe)
Mirmo! (Shichirō)
Tenchi Muyo! GXP (Seina Yamada)

Game
Judie no Atelier
Princess Maker

Dubbing
Fight Back to School
Jimmy Two-Shoes - Sammy
"Mickey Mouse Clubhouse- Toodles

External links

81 Produce voice actors
Living people
1973 births
Male voice actors from Kanagawa Prefecture
Japanese male voice actors